Hugh Lindsay may refer to:
Hugh Primrose Lindsay (1765–1844), British naval captain, Director of East India Company
Hugh Hamilton Lindsay (1802–1881), British businessman, Director of East India Company
Hugh B. Lindsay (1856–1944), American attorney, jurist and politician
Hugh Lindsay (bishop) (1927–2009), Roman Catholic bishop
Hugh Lindsay (footballer) (born 1938), English amateur footballer who played for Southampton and appeared in the 1960 Olympics
Hugh Lindsay (British Army officer) (1954–1988), equerry to Queen Elizabeth II, 1983–1986
SS Hugh Lindsay, part of the Bombay Marine, a paddle sloop which carried mail between Bombay and Suez from 1830 onward